The term Junge Wilde (German for "young wild ones") was originally applied to trends within the art world, and was only later used with reference to politics. At present, the term is used by German-language journalists to describe any group within a tradition that seeks to undermine established authority.

Artistic movement
In 1978, the Junge Wilde painting style arose in the German-speaking world in opposition to established avant garde, minimal art and conceptual art. It was linked to the similar Transavanguardia movement in Italy, USA (neo-expressionism) and France (Figuration Libre). The Junge Wilde painted their expressive paintings in bright, intense colors and with quick, broad brushstrokes very much influenced by Professor at the Academy of Art in Berlin, Karl Horst Hödicke (b:1938). They were sometimes called the Neue Wilde (:de:Neue Wilde).

Influential artists
 Austria: Siegfried Anzinger, Erwin Bohatsch, Herbert Brandl, Gunter Damisch, Hubert Scheibl, Hubert Schmalix, G.L. Gabriel-Thieler
 Denmark: Berit Heggenhougen-Jensen, Nina Sten-Knudsen
 Germany:
 Berlin: Luciano Castelli, Rainer Fetting, Andreas Walther, Helmut Middendorf, Salomé, Bernd Zimmer, Elvira Bach, Peter Robert Keil
 Cologne: Hans Peter Adamski, Peter Bömmels, Walter Dahn, Jiri Georg Dokoupil, Leiko Ikemura, Gerard Kever, Gerhard Naschberger, Volker Tannert, Elias Maria Reti, Stefan Szczesny
 Dresden: A. R. Penck
 Düsseldorf: Moritz Reichelt, Jörg Immendorff, Albert Oehlen, Markus Oehlen, Martin Kippenberger, Markus Lüpertz, Werner Buettner, Horst Gläsker, Peter Angermann
 Karlsruhe: Bernd Erich Gall
 Switzerland: Martin Disler

Later usage
The term Junge Wilde began to be used by the media in the 1990s with reference to a certain group of politicians who bucked party leadership to make their names. It was first used with reference to the German CDU party (particularly against Helmut Kohl).

Since then the term has also been applied to members of other parties.

References

Political party factions in Germany
German art movements